The 5th constituency of Isère is one of ten French legislative constituencies in the Isère département.

It was defined in 1986 to cover the then cantons of
Allevard, Domène, Goncelin, Saint-Égrève, Saint-Geoire-en-Valdaine, Saint-Laurent-du-Pont and Le Touvet.

Deputies

Election Results

2022

 
 
 
 
 
|-
| colspan="8" bgcolor="#E9E9E9"|
|-

2017

2012

2007

 
 
 
 
 
 
 
|-
| colspan="8" bgcolor="#E9E9E9"|
|-

2002

 
 
 
 
 
 
|-
| colspan="8" bgcolor="#E9E9E9"|
|-

1997

 
 
 
 
 
 
 
|-
| colspan="8" bgcolor="#E9E9E9"|
|-

References

5